Mojiz Hasan is a Pakistani theatre and film actor. He has appeared in several notable theatre plays and feature films. In 2019, he played a role of Jerry in Azfar Jafri's Heer Maan Ja opposite Hareem Farooq and Ali Rehman Khan. Mojiz Hasan is known for his comedy, his acting skills are natural. As per the Big stars of Lollywood, "Mojiz Hasan is the real actor, he is what he is". "His acting skills are natural, he is the same in real life and off the camera". Mojiz Hasan started his career as an stage actor for some well known stage shows written by Pakistan's biggest star "Anwar Maqsood". After his stage shows Mojiz Hasan become famous for his acting skills and in 2018 he signed up for his first featured film "Parchi". His comedy character was highlighted so much that in the year 2019 and 2021 "Mojiz Hasan" signed 2 more films. He is not only an actor but also a Gold Medalist from Pakistan's 1 of the top University "Indus Valley School of Arts". Mojiz Hasan completed his graduation in the year 2016 in Communication Design and was awarded the Alumni Award.

Filmography

Film

Television

Theatre

References

External links 

Pakistani male film actors
Pakistani male stage actors
Year of birth missing (living people)
Living people
21st-century Pakistani male actors